William A. Graham may refer to:
William Alexander Graham (1804–1875), American politician; Whig from North Carolina
William A. Graham (agriculture commissioner) (1839–1923), American politician and Civil War veteran
William A. Graham (director) (1926–2013), American television and film director
William A. Graham (dean) (born 1943), dean of Harvard Divinity School from 2002 to 2012

See also
William Graham (disambiguation)
Graham (surname)